Akurana Divisional Secretariat is a  Divisional Secretariat  of Kandy District, of Central Province, Sri Lanka.

References
 Divisional Secretariats Portal

Divisional Secretariats of Kandy District
Geography of Kandy District